The 2008 Asian Women's Club Volleyball Championship was the 9th staging of the AVC Club Championships. The tournament was held in Vinh Yen Gymnasium, Vĩnh Yên, Vĩnh Phúc Province, Vietnam.

Pools composition
The teams are seeded based on their final ranking at the 2007 Asian Women's Club Volleyball Championship.

Preliminary round

Pool A

|}

|}

Pool B

|}

|}

Final round

Championship

Quarterfinals

|}

5th–8th semifinals

|}

Semifinals

|}

7th place

|}

5th place

|}

3rd place

|}

Final

|}

Final standing

Awards
MVP:  Li Shan (Tianjin)
Best Scorer:  Saori Sakoda (Toray)
Best Server:  Yu Jing (Tianjin)
Best Spiker:  Huo Jing (Tianjin)
Best Blocker:  Alessys Safronova (Zhetyssu)
Best Libero:  Kanari Hamaguchi (Toray)
Best Setter:  Nootsara Tomkom (Sang Som)
Miss Volleyball:  Phạm Thị Yến (Sport Center 1)

References
Asian Volleyball Confederation

International volleyball competitions hosted by Vietnam
A
Asian